Trent Anthony Bray (born 1 September 1973, in Auckland) is a former freestyle swimmer and surf lifesaver from New Zealand, who competed at two consecutive Summer Olympics. He also won three gold medals and three bronze at the 1998 World Surf Lifesaving Championships

Early life

Bray attended Lynfield College in Auckland.

Olympic Games
 1992 in Barcelona, Spain. 200m Freestyle (26th), 4 × 100 m Freestyle Relay - Men (9th), 4 × 200 m Freestyle Relay - Men (11th)
 1996 in Atlanta, United States. - 200m Freestyle (20th), 4 × 100 m Freestyle Relay - Men (9th), 4 × 200 m Freestyle Relay - Men (9th)

World championships
 Silver Medal - 200m freestyle at the 1993 World Short-Course Championships Palma, Majorca, Spain. This was a new New Zealand and Commonwealth record. World ranking: 2
 Gold Medal - 4 × 100 m medley relay at the 1995 World Short-Course Championships, Rio de Janeiro, Brazil. Bray's time of 48.55 seconds was a New Zealand record time and the relay total time was an NZ record and the 4th fastest time ever recorded at that date.
 Silver Medal - 200m Freestyle at the 1997 World Short-Course Championships, Gothenburg, Sweden. World ranking: 3

Commonwealth Games
 Silver medal in the 200m Freestyle at the 1994 Commonwealth Games in Victoria, Canada
 Silver medal in the  Men's 4x200 Freestyle Relay Team 1994 Commonwealth Games in Victoria, Canada
 Silver medal in the  Men's 4x100 Freestyle Relay Team 1994 Commonwealth Games in Victoria, Canada
 Bronze with the Men's 4x200 Freestyle Relay Team 1998 in Kuala Lumpur, Malaysia.

See also
 List of Commonwealth Games medallists in swimming (men)

References

 swiminfo.co.nz

1973 births
Living people
Olympic swimmers of New Zealand
New Zealand male freestyle swimmers
Swimmers at the 1992 Summer Olympics
Swimmers at the 1996 Summer Olympics
Swimmers from Auckland
Commonwealth Games silver medallists for New Zealand
Commonwealth Games bronze medallists for New Zealand
Swimmers at the 1994 Commonwealth Games
Swimmers at the 1998 Commonwealth Games
Medalists at the FINA World Swimming Championships (25 m)
New Zealand surf lifesavers
Commonwealth Games medallists in swimming
People educated at Lynfield College
Medallists at the 1994 Commonwealth Games
Medallists at the 1998 Commonwealth Games